The 2003 Formula BMW Asia season was held in 2003. It was won by the Meritus team, with Ho-Pin Tung. Tung claimed twelve pole positions and ten wins in 14 races during the course of the season, which spanned five countries.

Tung's reward was a test drive with the then BMW powered Williams F1 Team at the 4.428 kilometer (2.7 mile) Circuito de Jerez.

Teams and drivers
All cars were Mygale FB02 chassis powered by BMW engines.

Races

Standings 
Points were awarded as follows:

Drivers' Championship

Rookie Cup

References

External links
 BMW Group's press releases for Formula BMW Asia
 BMW-Motorsport.com

Formula BMW seasons
2003 in motorsport 
2003 in Asian sport
BMW Asia